Neenchelys microtretus is an eel in the family Ophichthidae (worm/snake eels). It was described by R.C. Bamber in 1915. It is a marine, temperate, water-dwelling eel which is known from the Red Sea, in the western Indian Ocean.

References

Fish described in 1915
microtetus